Passage Canal is a bay of Prince William Sound on the east coast of the Kenai Peninsula of Alaska, United States. Its only settlement is the small town of Whittier, located near the head of the bay.

It is called the gateway to Prince William Sound as many water taxis, kayak tours, anglers, and recreational boaters use the bay to access nearby state marine parks and federal cabins.

The town of Whittier was founded along the banks of Passage Canal to serve as a secret deep water port for the U.S. Military during World War II.

Fatalities and incidents
On April 1, 2018, Anchorage resident Karl Stoltz went missing after departing Whittier's deep water port in a small skiff to harvest crabs over Easter. Earlier, he had been spotted experiencing issues with the engine of the watercraft, which had recently been bought on Craigslist. His hypothermic body was found floating two days later, attached to lines hooked to crab pots after an intensive Coast Guard search.

References

Bays of Alaska
Bodies of water of Kenai Peninsula Borough, Alaska
Kenai Mountains-Turnagain Arm National Heritage Area